Wabash County is a county located in the northern central part of the U.S. state of Indiana.  As of 2020, the population was 30,976.  The county seat is Wabash.

History
The area was inhabited for thousands of years by cultures of indigenous peoples. French explorers and traders encountered the historical Miami Native Americans beginning in the 17th century.

Wabash County, along with Delaware County, was originally formed Jan. 1820 out of the 1818 New Purchase resulting from the Treaty of St. Mary's. Wabash County was the Wabash River drainage area, and Delaware County, the White River drainage area.  Numerous counties were carved out of the Wabash New Purchase. Wabash County as it exists today was organized out of a remnant portion of the original county in 1835.

The name "Wabash" is an English spelling of the earlier French name for the river, Ouabache.  French traders derived the French version from the Indian name for the river, Wabashike (pronounced "Wah-bah-she-keh") (meaning "pure white".)  Much of the river bottom is white limestone, now obscured by mud.

Geography

Adjacent counties
 Kosciusko County  (north)
 Whitley County  (northeast)
 Huntington County  (east)
 Grant County  (south)
 Miami County (west)
 Fulton County (northwest)

Cities
 Wabash

Towns
 La Fontaine
 Lagro
 North Manchester
 Roann

Census-designated places
 Laketon
 Somerset

Other unincorporated places

 America
 Bolivar
 College Corner
 Disko
 Ijamsville
 Liberty Mills
 Lincolnville
 Mount Vernon
 Newton
 Pioneer
 Richvalley
 Servia
 South Haven
 Speicherville
 Stockdale
 Sunnymede
 Treaty
 Urbana
 Valley Brook

Extinct
 Dora
 Rose Hill

Townships

 Chester
 Lagro
 Liberty
 Noble
 Paw Paw
 Pleasant
 Waltz

Major highways

  U.S. Route 24
  Indiana State Road 13
  Indiana State Road 15
  Indiana State Road 16
  Indiana State Road 114
  Indiana State Road 115
  Indiana State Road 124
  Indiana State Road 218
  Indiana State Road 524

Climate and weather 

Government

The county government is a constitutional body, and is granted specific powers by the Constitution of Indiana, and by the Indiana Code.

County Council: The county council is the legislative branch of the county government and controls all the spending and revenue collection in the county. Representatives are elected from county districts. The council members serve four-year terms. They are responsible for setting salaries, the annual budget, and special spending. The council also has limited authority to impose local taxes, in the form of an income and property tax that is subject to state level approval, excise taxes, and service taxes.

Board of Commissioners: The executive body of the county is made of a board of commissioners. The commissioners are elected county-wide, in staggered terms, and each serves a four-year term. One of the commissioners, typically the most senior, serves as president. The commissioners are charged with executing the acts legislated by the council, collecting revenue, and managing the day-to-day functions of the county government.

Court: The county maintains a small claims court that can handle some civil cases. The judge on the court is elected to a term of four years and must be a member of the Indiana Bar Association. The judge is assisted by a constable who is also elected to a four-year term. In some cases, court decisions can be appealed to the state level circuit court.

County Officials: The county has several other elected offices, including sheriff, assessor, prosecutor, coroner, auditor, treasurer, recorder, surveyor, and circuit court clerk. Each of these elected officers serves a term of four years and oversees a different part of county government. Members elected to county government positions are required to declare party affiliations and to be residents of the county.

Wabash County is a Republican stronghold in presidential elections. Since 1888, only two Republican Party candidates have lost the county, William Howard Taft in 1912 & Barry Goldwater in 1964.

Demographics

As of the 2010 United States Census, there were 32,888 people, 12,777 households, and 8,733 families residing in the county. The racial makeup of the county was 96.6% white, 0.7% American Indian, 0.5% black or African American, 0.4% Asian, 0.7% from other races, and 1.1% from two or more races. Those of Hispanic or Latino origin made up 2.1% of the population. In terms of ancestry, 31.3% were German, 18.1% were American, 10.1% were English, and 10.0% were Irish.

Of the 12,777 households, 29.9% had children under the age of 18 living with them, 54.4% were married couples living together, 9.5% had a female householder with no husband present, 31.7% were non-families, and 27.3% of all households were made up of individuals. The average household size was 2.43 and the average family size was 2.92. The median age was 41.2 years.

The median income for a household in the county was $47,697 and the median income for a family was $52,758. Males had a median income of $41,965 versus $26,944 for females. The per capita income for the county was $20,475. About 8.8% of families and 11.6% of the population were below the poverty line, including 15.5% of those under age 18 and 8.1% of those age 65 or over.

See also
 National Register of Historic Places listings in Wabash County, Indiana

References

External links
 https://web.archive.org/web/20120621233635/http://www.wabasharea.net/
 Wabash County Website

 
Indiana counties
Indiana placenames of Native American origin
1835 establishments in Indiana
Populated places established in 1835